Olivera Injac (Montenegrin Cyrillic: Оливера Ињац; born 1976 in Podgorica) is a Montenegrin university professor of security and independent politician who served as the Minister of Defence in the Government of Montenegro and the cabinet of Zdravko Krivokapić from 4 December 2020 to 28 April 2022. 

Injac graduated from the Faculty of Philosophy in Nikšić in 1999, and completed her postgraduate studies in 2005 at the Faculty of Political Sciences in Podgorica. She defended her master's degree at the Podgorica Faculty of Political Sciences, and received her doctorate on the topic "Cultural aspect of international security", in January 2011. She was employed in the Ministry of Internal Affairs of Montenegro from 2000 until 2007, as part of the Public Security Services and the Department of Analytics, as an independent advisor and analyst. At the University of Donja Gorica in Podgorica, she has been employed since 2008, as a professor of security. She is the only professor of security in Montenegro. 

On 27 November 2020, the Prime Minister-designate of Montenegro, Zdravko Krivokapić, appointed her a candidate for the Minister of Defence in the new Government cabinet of Montenegro.

References

Living people
1976 births
People from Podgorica
University of Montenegro alumni
Montenegrin women in politics
Defence ministers of Montenegro
Female defence ministers
Women government ministers of Montenegro